William Brittain may refer to:

 William Brittain (cricketer), cricketer for Nottingham Cricket Club
 William Brittain (British Free Corps), English member of the British Free Corps
 Bill Brittain (1930–2011), American writer
 Will Brittain (born 1990), American actor

See also
 William Britain (disambiguation)